Antony "Antton" Lant is an English drummer, best known for his time with thrash metal band Venom. He was the band's drummer from 2000 to 2009 and recorded three albums with them. His oldest brother is Graham Lant, former drummer of Prefab Sprout, and he is also the brother of Venom's lead singer "Cronos". He is a direct cousin of the frontman of Enthroned, Nornagest.

Lant left Venom in order to concentrate on his groove metal band Def-Con-One. He was also a part of the metal band Dryll together with former Venom guitarist Jeffrey Dunn. Although he is best known as a drummer, he is also an avid guitarist.

Lant played drums for Mpire of Evil (formerly Primevil) alongside Jeffrey Dunn and Tony Dolan until 2012 before leaving to concentrate on Def-Con-One. In 2012, they released the album Warface with Lant on drums.

Discography

With Venom 
Resurrection (2000)
Metal Black (2006)
Hell (2008)

With Mpire of Evil 
Creatures of The Black (2011)
Hell to the Holy (2012)

With Def-Con-One 
Warface (2012)
II (2014)

References 

Living people
English heavy metal drummers
Year of birth missing (living people)